William Easton  (born 17 July 1986) is a Scottish footballer who plays for Kilsyth Rangers in the Scottish Junior Football Association, West Region as a left winger. He began his career in the Scottish Premier League for Dundee United, making his debut in 2006. He also played for Stirling Albion on loan before signing for Ayr United in 2008. Since entering junior football in 2011, Easton has had spells with Kirkintilloch Rob Roy, Pollok and Cambuslang Rangers prior to joining Kilsyth in 2015.

Career
Easton was a product of Dundee United's youth system and made his first-team debut for United in May 2006, as a substitute in the 1–1 draw against Motherwell on the final day of the 2005–06 SPL season. The following season, Easton made a further seven appearances, with one start in May 2007. Earlier, in January 2007, Easton began training with Raith Rovers in preparation for a loan move, although no move materialised.

On 28 August 2007, Easton moved on loan to Stirling Albion, making his debut in the 2–0 defeat by Heart of Midlothian in the League Cup match that same day. He returned to Dundee United at the end of 2007 and was released from his contract a few days later. On 6 January 2008, Easton joined Ayr United.

Easton was released by Ayr in May 2011 and joined Junior side Kirkintilloch Rob Roy later that summer. Easton Joined Pollok at the start of season 2013–14 before moving to Cambuslang Rangers in 2014 and then Kilsyth Rangers in 2015.

Career statistics

References

External links
 

1986 births
Sportspeople from Rutherglen
Living people
Scottish footballers
Scottish Premier League players
Dundee United F.C. players
Stirling Albion F.C. players
Ayr United F.C. players
Kirkintilloch Rob Roy F.C. players
Scottish Junior Football Association players
Scottish Football League players
Pollok F.C. players
Cambuslang Rangers F.C. players
Kilsyth Rangers F.C. players
Association football wingers
Footballers from South Lanarkshire